Kalevi Ensio Aho (born 9 March 1949) is a Finnish composer.

Early years

Aho began his interest in music at the age of ten, when he discovered a mandolin in his home and began to teach himself how to play it. He soon was taken under the tutelage of Martti Loikkanen, the boy's 4th grade teacher and founder of a local youth mandolin ensemble in Forssa. After learning how to read sheet music, Aho immediately started composing. Aho progressed so fast on the instrument that Loikkanen suggested he study the violin as well, with Loikkanen giving him private lessons. Aho also began to learn violin at an incredible speed, with him later recalling, "Martti taught me at home for free until I started skipping him out of my playing skills and he suggested changing teachers." Aho's parents were quite supportive of his musical hobby, encouraging him to compose and giving him a piano at the age of 15.

Career

He moved from the city of Forssa to Helsinki in September 1968 to study at the Sibelius Academy. He studied composition at the Sibelius Academy under Einojuhani Rautavaara, beginning that year and receiving a diploma in 1971. He continued his studies for a year in Berlin with Boris Blacher. His teaching positions include music theory at the University of Helsinki from 1974 to 1988, and a professorship at the Sibelius Academy from 1988 to 1993. He was named composer-in-residence for the Lahti Symphony Orchestra in 1992, and conductor Osmo Vänskä has recorded many of his recent large-scale works with the orchestra. Aho has worked as a freelance composer, with a state scholarship, since 1993. He lives in Helsinki.

Music

Known principally as a composer of large-scale works,  Aho has composed seventeen symphonies, thirty-seven concertos, five operas and several vocal works. His chamber music includes several quintets, quartets, sonatas and solo works. He first came to fame with his first symphony (1969) and second string quartet (1970).

His works of this time showed such neo-classical traits as a preoccupation with counterpoint (particularly fugues), and stylized renderings of older forms, such as the waltz. In the following decade he wrote in modernist and post-modernist styles. His use of irony and juxtaposition of contrasting moods and musical styles and genres has been compared to Gustav Mahler and Alfred Schnittke.

References

Literature
 Korhonen, Kimmo (1999). Kalevi Aho in Profile.  Finnish Music Information Centre. Retrieved 8 February 2005.
 Oramo, Ilkka. "Aho, Kalevi." at Grove Music Online.  Retrieved 21 September 2006.

External links
 Music Finland Core | Kalevi Aho.
 Aho, Kalevi – Fennica German. Publisher's website with audio samples and promotional scores.
 

1949 births
Living people
People from Forssa
20th-century classical composers
21st-century classical composers
Finnish classical composers
Finnish male classical composers
Finnish opera composers
Male opera composers
Finnish mandolinists
Finnish violinists
20th-century male musicians
21st-century male musicians
20th-century Finnish composers
21st-century Finnish composers